Carex fecunda is a tussock-forming species of perennial sedge in the family Cyperaceae. It is native to parts of South America.

See also
List of Carex species

References

fecunda
Plants described in 1855
Taxa named by Ernst Gottlieb von Steudel
Flora of Argentina
Flora of Bolivia
Flora of Peru
Flora of Brazil